Biesiadki  is a village in the administrative district of Gmina Gnojnik, within Brzesko County, Lesser Poland Voivodeship, in southern Poland.

References

Biesiadki